Barbara Andersen may refer to:

Barbara Andersen (editor), see CITR-FM
Barbara Andersen, character in Aux frontières du possible

See also
Barbara Anderson (disambiguation)